Jérémy De Vriendt (born 22 March 1986) is a Belgian football goalkeeper. He previously played for Standard Liège, KV Mechelen and White Star Woluwe.

References

1986 births
Association football goalkeepers
Standard Liège players
K.V. Mechelen players
Living people
RWS Bruxelles players
Belgian footballers